Dissingia leucomelaena, commonly known as the white-footed elf cup, is a species of fungi in the family Helvellaceae of the order Pezizales. As its common name implies, it is characterized by the white coloring of its stem.

Description
The deeply cup-shaped cap of the fruiting body is up to  broad. The outer surface of the cap is blackish-brown near the top, with the color turning to white as it near the stem; the inner surface of the cup is blackish.

Helvella acetabulum is a similar species, with more defined ribs.

Distribution
In North America, this fungus is rare, but it has been collected in California, Alaska, and the Rocky Mountains. It has also been found in South America and Europe. It typically grows in coniferous forests, and the white stipe may be hidden or obscured by leaves or may be partially buried in the soil. It can be found from spring to early summer.

Edibility
Consumption of this fungus is not recommended as similar species in the family Helvellaceae contain the toxin gyromitrin.

References

External links
Index Fungorum

leucomelaena
Fungi of Europe